My Fellow Citizens! is a 2019 South Korean television series starring Choi Si-won, Lee Yoo-young and Kim Min-jung. It aired from April 1 to May 28, 2019 on KBS2.

Synopsis
A con man, who gets involved with unexpected incidents, marries a police officer and somehow ends up running to become a member of the National Assembly.

Cast

Main
 Choi Si-won as Yang Jung-kook, a skilled fraudster who is the third-generation of a family of con artists. He gets involved with a loan shark in order to earn big sum of money for his marriage, only to get scammed by his ex-girlfriend who runs off with the marriage funds.
 Lee Yoo-young as Kim Mi-young, a police detective who catches her ex-boyfriend cheating on her, but fatefully meets Jung-kook. The two become close and soon begin dating. She chooses to lie about her job to keep their relationship and finally decides to confess her true life to Jung-kook on their wedding day.
 Kim Min-jung as Park Hoo-ja, fourth daughter of Park Sang-pil, a notorious loan shark, who trains to become his successor. Her father collapses after being a victim of a mysterious stranger's schemes. After her father's death, she inherits and successfully expands their business. She also tracks down the person who conned her father—Jung-kook. But instead of revenge, she offers to save his life as long as he runs for a seat in the National Assembly.

Supporting
 Tae In-ho as Han Sang-jin, a political newcomer who is the step-brother of Mi-young.
 Kim Eui-sung as Kim Joo-myung, a veteran politician who is a member of the National Assembly.
 Im Ji-hyun as Yoo Hee-jin, Jung-kook's ex-girlfriend. 
 Jeon Seok-ho as Kang Hyun-tae, Sang-jin's former university colleague and current policy adviser. 
 Heo Jae-ho as Choi Pil-joo, Hoo-ja's right-hand man.
 Lee Joo-myung as Hwang Seung-yi
 Ahn Eun-jin as Park Gwi-nam
 Jung Soo-young as Myung-in
 Ji Yi-soo as Detective Na
 Kim Min-jae as Kim Nam-hwa

Special appearance
 Yeom Hye-ran as Sun Hee, Park Hoo-Ja's second older sister. (Ep. 11)

Original soundtrack

Part 1

Part 2

Part 3

Part 4

Part 5

Part 6

Ratings

Awards and nominations

American adaptation

In March 2022, ABC ordered the pilot of an American adaptation of the series titled The Company You Keep, starring Milo Ventimiglia. It is being written and executive produced by Julia Cohen for 20th Television. In April and May 2022, Catherine Haena Kim and William Fichtner joined the cast in the pilot, respectively. Also in May, Sarah Wayne Callies, James Saito, Tim Chiou, Freda Foh Shen and Felisha Terrell were added to cast. In August 2022, ABC picked up the series. It premiered on February 19, 2023.

Notes

References

External links
  
 
 
 

Korean Broadcasting System television dramas
Korean-language television shows
2019 South Korean television series debuts
2019 South Korean television series endings
South Korean comedy television series
South Korean crime television series
Television series by Monster Union